Phytoecia repetkensis is a species of beetle in the family Cerambycidae. It was described by Semenov in 1935. It is known from Kazakhstan and Turkmenistan.

References

Phytoecia
Beetles described in 1935